Aboubacar "Iyanga" Sylla (born 1 May 1993) is a Guinean international football midfielder.

He took his nickname from Equatoguinean footballer Iban Iyanga, who scored a goal against Senegal (Guinea's classic rival) at the 2012 Africa Cup of Nations.

International career

International goals
Scores and results list Guinea's goal tally first.

References

External links 
 

1993 births
Living people
Guinean footballers
Guinean expatriate footballers
Guinea international footballers
Expatriate footballers in Indonesia
Guinean expatriate sportspeople in Indonesia
Liga 1 (Indonesia) players
PS TIRA players
Association football midfielders
Guinea A' international footballers
2016 African Nations Championship players